Monika Heinold (born 30 December 1958 in Gütersloh) is a German politician of Alliance 90/The Greens and current  Schleswig-Holstein Deputy Minister-President and Minister of Finance.

Career 
Heinold grew up in Langenhorn, Hamburg, and began her professional career in day care. She joined Alliance 90/The Greens in 1984. From 1990 to 1994 she was a member of the regional parliament in her home district of Segeberg.

Heinold was a member of Landtag of Schleswig-Holstein from 1996 to 2012. Throughout her time in parliament, she served on the Finance Committee, which she co-chaired from 2009 until 2012. In addition, she was a member of the Committee on the Election of Judges (1996–2000) and the Committee on Social Affairs (2000–2006).

Since the 2012 state elections, Heinold has been serving as State Minister of Finance in the cabinets of Ministers-President Torsten Albig (2012–2017) and Daniel Günther (since 2017, Cabinet Günther) of Schleswig-Holstein. As one of the state's representatives at the Bundesrat, she serves on the body's Finance Committee.

In the negotiations to form a so-called traffic light coalition of the Social Democratic Party (SPD), the Green Party and the Free Democratic Party (FDP) following the 2021 national elections, Heinold was part of her party's delegation in the working group on financial regulation and the national budget, co-chaired by Doris Ahnen, Lisa Paus and Christian Dürr. 

Heinold was a Green Party delegate to the Federal Convention for the purpose of electing the President of Germany in 2004, 2017 and 2022.

Following the Resignation of Jan Philipp Albrecht, Heinold additionally took on his duties as acting Minister of Energy Transition, Agriculture, the Environment, Nature and Digitalisation between 2 June and 29 June 2022.

Other activities
 Stability Council, Ex-Officio Member 
 KfW, Member of the Board of Supervisory Directors (since 2018)
 HSH Nordbank, Member of the Advisory Board (2004–2005)

Personal life 
Heinold has two sons. In 2007, she moved from Segeberg to Kiel.

External links 

  Schleswig-Holsteinischer Landtag
Monika Heinold by finance ministerium Schleswig-Holstein

References 

Members of the Landtag of Schleswig-Holstein
Local politicians in Germany
Ministers of the Schleswig-Holstein State Government
20th-century German politicians
21st-century German politicians
20th-century German women politicians
21st-century German women politicians
Alliance 90/The Greens politicians
Politicians from Schleswig-Holstein
1958 births
People from Gütersloh
Living people